Slashing may refer to:

 Slashing, a technique in historic European fashion
 Slashing (crime), an attack with a blade intended to harm a victim
 Slashing (ice hockey), a penalty in ice hockey where a player swings his stick at another

See also
 Slash (disambiguation)
 Slasher (disambiguation)